Ethnoornithology (also ethno-ornithology) is the study of the relationship between people and birds (from "ethno-" - relating to people and culture - and "ornithology" - the study of birds). It is a branch of ethnozoology and so of the wider field of ethnobiology. Ethnoornithology is an interdisciplinary subject and combines anthropological, cognitive and linguistic perspectives with natural scientific approaches to the description and interpretation of people's knowledge and use of birds. Like ethnoscience and other cognate terms, "ethnoornithology" is sometimes used narrowly to refer to people's practice rather than the study of that practice. The broader focus is on how birds are perceived, used and managed in human societies, including their use for food, medicine and personal adornment, as well as their use in divination and ritual. Applied ethnoornithological research is also starting to play an increasingly important role in the development of conservation initiatives.

History of ethnoornithology 
The work of Ralph Bulmer in New Guinea, culminating in his collaboration with Ian Saem Majnep in writing Birds of My Kalam Country (1977), set a new standard for ethnoornithological research, and this book has deservedly become a classic of modern ethno-ornithology.

Approaches to ethnoornithology

Ethnoornithology and conservation 
Like other branches of ethnozoology, ethnoornithology has been long undervalued as a resource for conservation, though this is now beginning to change. Mark Bonta's Seven Names for the Bellbird (2003), which highlights the importance of local traditions and practices relating to birds for the future of biodiversity conservation in Honduras, and Ricardo Rozzi's Multi-ethnic Bird Guide of the Subantarctic Forests of South America (2003), which focuses on the integration of traditional ornithological knowledge and environmental ethics in southern Chile, provide good examples of this trend. Soma (2015) pointed out that ethnoornithological knowledge of falconers contribute to conservation for local avifauna (especially focusing on Kazakh eagle masters). This realisation is the basis for founding the Ethno-ornithology World Archive (EWA), a collaborative project between Oxford University (linking the Department of Zoology and School of Anthropology and Museum Ethnography) and BirdLife International.

Professional associations 
The Society of Ethnobiology, which publishes the Journal of Ethnobiology, provides a general forum for ethnobiological - including ethnoornthological - research. In January 2006, the Ethnoornithology Research & Study Group (ERSG) was established "to provide a clearinghouse, information source and discussion point for people interested in the study of, research about and application of indigenous bird knowledge".

References 

Aillapan L. & R. Rozzi. 2001. Twenty Winged Poems from the native forests of southern Chile. Two CDs of indigenous poems by the Mapuche shaman Lorenzo Aillapán, recorded in the forests of southern Chile in combination with bird vocalizations. Contain a book with an explanatory preface and bilingual text Mapudungún-English of the poems with illustration of the birds by D. Martínez. General direction and design by Ricardo Rozzi. Editorial Plaza y Valdés, Mexico. 
Bonta, M. (2003). Seven Names for the Bellbird: Conservation Geography in Honduras. College Station: Texas A&M University Press.
Feld, S. (1982). Sound and Sentiment: Birds, Weeping, Poetics, and Song in Kaluli Expressions. Philadelphia: University of Pennsylvania Press. (2nd edition published in 1990).
Forth, G. (2004). Nage Birds: Classification and Symbolism among an Eastern Indonesian People. London & New York: Routledge.
Ibarra JT, Barreau A, Massardo F & Rozzi R (2012) El Cóndor Andino: una especie biocultural clave del paisaje
sudamericano. Boletín Chileno de Ornitología 18:1–22
Majnep, I.S. & Bulmer, R.B. (1977). Birds of My Kalam Country. Auckland: Auckland University Press.
Paredes-Castellanos, A., & Rozzi, R. (2018). Biocultural exoticism in the feminine landscape of Latin America. In From Biocultural Homogenization to Biocultural Conservation (pp. 167–183). Springer, Cham.
Rozzi, R. et al. (2003) Multi-ethnic Bird Guide of the Subantarctic Forests of South America. University of North Texas Press & Ediciones Universidad de Magallanes. (2nd edition published in 2010, http://muse.jhu.edu/books/9781574413458).
Tidemann, S. & Gosler, A. (2010). Ethno-ornithology: Birds, Indigenous Peoples, Cultures, and Society. London: Earthscan (Routledge).
Soma, Takuya. (2015). "Human & Raptor Interactions in the Context of a Nomadic Society: Anthropological and Ethno-Ornithological Studies of Altaic Kazakh Falconry and its Cultural Sustainability in Western Mongolia". Germany: University of Kassel Press.

External links 
Ethnoornithology Research & Study Group (ESRG)
Society of Ethnobiology
Field notes on ethnoornithology in Kenya 
Interview by the Chilean poet Cristian Warnken with the Mapuche Birdman Lorenzo Aillapan and the Biocultural Conservationist and philosopher Ricardo Rozzi
Bird - Native Forest by Chilean film maker Olaf Pena, with the Mapuche Birdman Lorenzo Aillapan and the Biocultural Conservationist and philosopher Ricardo Rozzi

Ethnobiology
Anthropology
Ethnography
Ornithology